Dobrushta (or Dobrushtë, serbian: Дoбруште/Dobrušte) is a village in Prizren Municipality in southwest Kosovo.

History 
After the Kingdom of Serbia acquired Kosovo following the first Balkan War (1912), Serbia arranged a Military Administration named Vrbnica. Dobrušte was part of it. The municipality was part of the Srez (serb. Šar) of the Okrug Prizren. This administrative subdivision lastet till January 6, 1929, after the area was made part of the Vardar Banovina in the Kingdom Yugoslavia.

Geography 
Dobrushta is located in southwestern Kosovo, four kilometer east of Morina in Albania and nine Kilometers west of Prizren. Neighbouring villages are Vërmica, Zhur und Shkoza. The mountain landscape of the Koritnik starts south of the village.

The M-25 goes directly through the village and the R7 passes north of the village.

Climate

Notes

References 

Villages in Prizren